The following is a list of National Football League (American football) players that were named to the Associated Press All-Pro Team in 1965. Players from the first and second teams are listed, with players from the first team in bold, where applicable.

Teams

References
Pro-Football-Reference.com

All-Pro Teams
Allpro